Carlos Beltrán Martínez de Castro (born 1957) is a multi-keyboard player from Mexico.

Martínez de Castro undertook classical training since his childhood days, and his formative years would influence his later composing outcome. In the early  1970s, he was attracted to the sound of progressive rock of bands like Renaissance and Focus, but also to the so-called soft rock produced by performers like America and James Taylor. In 1987 Carlos released his only album to date, "Jericho", where he played all instruments, basically keyboards and percussion, whose sound was reminiscent of Klaus Schulze. The album didn't stir any grounds in his native country, but it was critically acclaimed first in Japan, then in other progressive quarters of Europe. Growing ever dissatisfied with the rock scene in Mexico, he opted to retire, but not before he distributed a home-made tape simply called "Familia Carbajal", where his expanding abilities as composer were evidenced. In 1997 "Jericho" appeared in CD format, making it accessible to a new generation of listeners from around the world.

References 

1956 births
Living people
Mexican musicians